Jesper Fredberg (born 11 May 1981) is a Danish football director who works as CEO Sports in R.S.C. Anderlecht who before that worked as Sport Director in Viborg FF. He was a coach in Panathinaikos F.C.'s youth academy, previously having worked with the club's technical director, Nikos Dabizas, as the coach of AC Omonia's youth academy. Fredberg had a brief spell as caretaker manager for Omonia's senior side, replacing Ivaylo Petev for the last seven matches of the 2017–18 Cypriot First Division season. He had previously assisted Omonia's caretaker manager Akis Ioakim at the end of the 2016–17 season.

Playing career
Born Aarhus, Fredberg began his career as a professional player at the age of 15. He played in the club of AGF Aarhus.

Coaching career
Fredberg is one of the youngest professional coaches in Danish football. He has worked as a trainer, but also as a Technical Director and Talent Detector. He left his country very young for his country.

 1998-2004 : TST Football (Denmark)

Head Coach of the young teams

 2005-2007 : Brabrand IF (Denmark)

Head  Coach of the young teams

 2007-2009 :  Aarhus GF (Denmark)

Head  Coach of the young teams

 2010-2013  : Brøndby IF (Denmark)

Head Coach of the young team

 2013-2014  : Aarhus GF (Denmark)

Head Coach of the professional Team

 2014-2016  : Danish Football Association (Denmark)

National Head Coach of U-23

 2016-2018  : Athletic Club Omonia Nicosia (Cyprus)

Head Coach and Technical Director of the club's academy

 2018-2019  : Panathinaikos Football Club (Greece)

Head Coach of the club's academy

 2019-2022  : Viborg FF (Denmark)

Sport Director

 2022-  : R.S.C. Anderlecht (Belgium)

CEO Sports

Personal life
Fredberg has a past in the Danish military as a Sergeant in The Royal Guard, and is a trained policeman. He speaks Danish, English, German, Swedish and Greek fluently.

Degrees and titles
 UEFA Pro Football Coach License recognized by FIFA
 MBA in Economics from Aarhus Business school
 MBA in Management from Aarhus Business school
 Sergeant in The Danish Royal Guard

References

Living people
1981 births
AC Omonia managers
Danish football managers
Danish men's footballers
Panathinaikos F.C. managers
Association footballers not categorized by position
Footballers from Aarhus